Francesca Dominici is a Harvard Professor who develops methodology in causal inference and data science and led research projects that combine big data with health policy and climate change. She is a professor of biostatistics, co-director of the Harvard Data Science Initiative, and a former senior associate dean for research in the Harvard T.H. Chan School of Public Health.

Education and career
Dominici earned a bachelor's degree in statistics from Sapienza University of Rome in 1993, and a Ph.D. in statistics from the University of Padua in 1997. She was a professor of biostatistics  at the Johns Hopkins Bloomberg School of Public Health from 1997 to 2009, with a joint appointment in epidemiology.
On moving to Harvard in 2009, she was also given an honorary Master of Public Health degree from Harvard, following the tradition that Harvard faculty must have Harvard degrees.

Contributions
Dominici has been active on many study committees on public health, organized by the National Academy of Sciences, National Institutes of Health, and others. As well, she has taken an active role in the status of university women. Her work on the Johns Hopkins University Committee on the Status of Women earned her the campus Diversity Recognition Award in 2009; at the Chan School of Public Health, she has led the Committee for the Advancement of Women Faculty since 2012.

Recognition
Dominici became a fellow of the American Statistical Association in 2005. She is also a Fellow of the Institute of Mathematical Statistics, and was elected to the National Academy of Medicine in 2018.

In 2006, she won the Mortimer Spiegelman Award of the American Public Health Association. She is the 2015 winner of the Florence Nightingale David Award of the Committee of Presidents of Statistical Societies, and the 2016 winner of the University of Alabama at Birmingham's Janet L. Norwood Award for Outstanding Achievement in Statistical Sciences, which honors a woman statistician for achievement. In 2020, she won the National Institute of Statistical Sciences (NISS) Jerome Sacks Award for Outstanding Cross-Disciplinary Research.

References

Year of birth missing (living people)
Living people
American statisticians
Italian statisticians
Women statisticians
Sapienza University of Rome alumni
University of Padua alumni
Johns Hopkins Bloomberg School of Public Health faculty
Harvard School of Public Health faculty
Fellows of the American Statistical Association
Fellows of the Institute of Mathematical Statistics
Members of the National Academy of Medicine